This is a list of types of funerary monument, a physical structure that commemorates a deceased person or a group, in the latter case usually those whose deaths occurred at the same time or in similar circumstances. It differs from a basic tomb or cemetery in that while it may or may not contain the body of the deceased, its primary purpose is not simply to house remains, but to serve as a visible reminder of the dead for the living. It often features inscriptions (epitaphs) or funerary art.

Commemorative
 Headstone
 Scottish gravestones
 Cenotaph (empty tomb)
 Mortuary house
Mausoleum
Catacombs
Pyramid
 Pillar tomb
 Heroon, herõon or heroum
 Sarcophagus (ornate types, otherwise being any stone-built receptacle)
 Recumbent effigy
 Rock-cut tombs in ancient Israel
 Stone ship
 Church monuments
 English church monuments
 Ledger stone
 Monumental brass
 Funerary hatchment
 Memorial cross
 War memorial
 Roadside memorial
"Eternal flame"

 Cultural precursors to burial/cremation
Mortuary enclosure
Ancient Egyptian funerary practices of the wealthy included the per nefer, house of beauty

See also
Memorial
Memorial bench
Commemorative plaque
 Funerary art

Archaeology of death
Burial monuments and structures
funerary monuments